This page shows the standings and results for Group B of the UEFA Euro 2012 qualifying tournament.

Standings

Matches
Group B fixtures were to be negotiated between the participants at a meeting in Moscow, Russia, on 15 and 16 March 2010. After that meeting proved inconclusive, the fixture list was determined by a random draw at the XXXIV Ordinary UEFA Congress in Tel Aviv, Israel, on 25 March.

Goalscorers

Discipline

References

Group B
Qual
2011–12 in Russian football
Russia at UEFA Euro 2012
2010–11 in Republic of Macedonia football
2011–12 in Republic of Macedonia football
2010–11 in Andorran football
2011–12 in Andorran football
2010–11 in Slovak football
2011–12 in Slovak football
2010 in Armenian football
2011 in Armenian football
Qual